Žarko Pejović (born 25 January 1986) is a Montenegrin handball player for RK Tineks Prolet and the Montenegrin national team.

References

1986 births
Living people
Montenegrin male handball players
People from Mojkovac
RK Crvena zvezda players
Expatriate handball players
Montenegrin expatriate sportspeople in Austria
Montenegrin expatriate sportspeople in France
Montenegrin expatriate sportspeople in North Macedonia
Montenegrin expatriate sportspeople in Romania
Montenegrin expatriate sportspeople in Serbia
Montenegrin expatriate sportspeople in Slovakia
Montenegrin expatriate sportspeople in Slovenia